Olsenella is a Gram-positive, non-spore-forming, obligate anaerobic and non-motile bacterial genus from the family Atopobiaceae. Olsenella is named after the microbiologist Ingar Olsen Olsenella bacteria are involved in endodontic infections in humans.

References

Further reading 
 
 
 

 

Actinomycetota
Bacteria genera